Calliergis ramosa is a moth of the family Noctuidae first described by Eugenius Johann Christoph Esper in 1786. It is found in central and southern Europe, from France north to the Netherlands, east to Poland, south through eastern Europe to Greece.

The larvae feed on Lonicera species.

External links

Fauna Europaea
Lepiforum e. V.

Cuculliinae
Moths of Europe
Taxa named by Eugenius Johann Christoph Esper
Moths described in 1786